Raúl Meraz Estrada (March 13, 1927 – April 20, 1996) was a Mexican actor of film and television.

Selected filmography
 It Happened in Mexico (1958)
La Valentina (1966)
El ojo de vidrio (1969)
Poor But Honest (1973)
La presidenta municipal (1975)
Los Ricos También Lloran (1979, television series)
Cuna de lobos (1986, television series)

External links

Mexican male film actors
Mexican male television actors
Mexican male telenovela actors
Male actors from Mexico City
1927 births
1996 deaths
20th-century Mexican male actors